1765 Wrubel, provisional designation , is a dark background asteroid from the outer regions of the asteroid belt, approximately 40 kilometers in diameter. It was discovered on 15 December 1957, by astronomers of the Indiana Asteroid Program at Goethe Link Observatory in Indiana, United States. The asteroid was named after Marshal Henry Wrubel, professor at Indiana University.

Orbit and classification 

Wrubel is a background asteroid that does not belong to any known asteroid family. It orbits the Sun in the outer main-belt at a distance of 2.6–3.7 AU once every 5 years and 8 months (2,065 days). Its orbit has an eccentricity of 0.18 and an inclination of 20° with respect to the ecliptic.

Physical characteristics 

Wrubel is a dark, carbonaceous asteroid. In the Tholen classification, its spectral type is ambiguous. Based on a numerical color analysis, it is closest to the dark D-type asteroid with some resemblance to the X-type asteroids (which encompass the primitive P-types).

Rotation period 

In July 2012, a rotational lightcurve of Wrubel was obtained from photometric observations. Lightcurve analysis gave a well-defined rotation period of 5.260 hours with a brightness amplitude of 0.33 magnitude.

Diameter and albedo 

According to the surveys carried out by the Japanese Akari satellite and the NEOWISE mission of NASA's Wide-field Infrared Survey Explorer, Wrubel measures between 37.704 and 42.20 kilometers in diameter  and its surface has an albedo between 0.113 and 0.1360.

The Collaborative Asteroid Lightcurve Link adopt the results obtained by the Infrared Astronomical Satellite IRAS, that is, an albedo of 0.1061 and a diameter of 42.33 kilometers with an absolute magnitude of 9.92.

Naming 

This minor planet was named after Marshal Henry Wrubel (1924–1968), professor of astronomy and faculty member at Indiana University, who was co-founder of the Indiana University Research Computing Center pioneering the use of high speed computers for astrophysical computations.

The name was proposed by Frank K. Edmondson, who initiated the Indiana Asteroid Program. The official  was published by the Minor Planet Center on 20 February 1971.

Notes

References

External links 
 Asteroid Lightcurve Database (LCDB), query form (info )
 Dictionary of Minor Planet Names, Google books
 Asteroids and comets rotation curves, CdR – Observatoire de Genève, Raoul Behrend
 Discovery Circumstances: Numbered Minor Planets (1)-(5000) – Minor Planet Center
 
 

001765
001765
Wrubel
001765
19571215